Luis Daniel Cupla (born January 5, 1977 in Montevideo, Uruguay) is a Uruguayan footballer currently playing for Independiente F.B.C. of the Primera División in Paraguay.

Teams
  Peñarol 2000
  Fénix 2001-2002
  Rentistas 2003
  Progreso 2004
  Sol de América 2004
  Olimpia 2005
  12 de Octubre 2005
  The Strongest 2006
  Sportivo Patria 2006
  Sol de América 2007-2008
  Kitchee FC 2009
  Sportivo Patria 2009
  Rampla Juniors 2010
  Independiente F.B.C. 2011–present

References
 
 

1977 births
Living people
Uruguayan footballers
Uruguayan expatriate footballers
Centro Atlético Fénix players
Peñarol players
C.A. Progreso players
C.A. Rentistas players
Rampla Juniors players
Club Sol de América footballers
12 de Octubre Football Club players
Independiente F.B.C. footballers
Club Olimpia footballers
The Strongest players
Expatriate footballers in Argentina
Expatriate footballers in Bolivia
Expatriate footballers in Paraguay
Expatriate footballers in Hong Kong
Association football midfielders